The patriarchs ( Avot, singular  Av) of the Bible, when narrowly defined, are Abraham, his son Isaac, and Isaac's son Jacob, also named Israel, the ancestor of the Israelites. These three figures are referred to collectively as the patriarchs, and the period in which they lived is known as the patriarchal age.

Judaism, Christianity, and Islam hold that the patriarchs, along with their primary wives, known as the matriarchs (Sarah, Rebekah and Leah) are entombed at the Cave of the Patriarchs, a site held holy by the three religions. Rachel, Jacob's other wife, is said to be buried separately at what is known as Rachel's Tomb, near Bethlehem, at the site where she is believed to have died in childbirth.

More widely, the term patriarchs can be used to refer to the twenty male ancestor-figures between Adam and Abraham. The first ten of these are called the antediluvian patriarchs, because they came before the Flood.

Definition
The patriarchs of the Bible, when narrowly defined, are Abraham, his son Isaac, and Isaac's son Jacob, also named Israel, the ancestor of the Israelites. These three figures are referred to collectively as the patriarchs, and the period in which they lived is known as the patriarchal age. They play significant roles in Hebrew scripture during and following their lifetimes. They are used as a significant marker by God in revelations and promises, and continue to play important roles in the Abrahamic faiths. Judaism, Christianity and Islam hold that the patriarchs, along with their primary wives, known as the matriarchs – Sarah (wife of Abraham), Rebekah (wife of Isaac) and Leah (one of the wives of Jacob) – are entombed at the Cave of Machpelah in Hebron, a site held holy by the three religions. Rachel is said to be buried separately at what is known as Rachel's Tomb, near Bethlehem, at the site where she is believed to have died in childbirth.

More widely, the term patriarchs can be used to refer to the twenty male ancestor-figures between Adam and Abraham. The first ten of these are called the antediluvian patriarchs, because they came before the Flood.

Lifespans
The lifetimes given for the patriarchs in the Masoretic Text of the Book of Genesis are:
Adam 930 years, Seth 912, Enos 905, Kenan 910, Mahalalel 895, Jared 962, Enoch 365 (did not die, but was taken away by God), Methuselah 969, Lamech 777, Noah 950. The lifespans given have surprising chronological implications, as the following quotation shows.

Matriarchs

The matriarchs, also known as "the four mothers" (ארבע האמהות), are:
 Sarah, the wife of Abraham
 Rebekah, the wife of Isaac
 Leah and Rachel, the wives of Jacob
 Secondary matriarchs — Some Jewish sources list Bilhah and Zilpah (Jacob's concubines) as additional matriarchs, for a total of six matriarchs. Other sources also include an emphasis on Tamar (the daughter-in-law of Judah) and Asenath (Osnat) (the wife of Joseph).

See also
 Chronology of the Bible

References

External links
 Dark Mirrors of Heaven: Timeline of the Patriarchs

 
Legendary progenitors
Groups of Roman Catholic saints